House of the Sun may refer to:

Locations
Beth Shemesh (Hebrew "house of the sun"), name of several biblical places
 Haleakalā (Hawaiian "house of the sun"), volcano in Maui
The House of the Sun Visitor Center, Crater Historic District, Hawaii
 Haleʻākala (Hawaiian "house of the sun"), historic house in Honolulu
House of the Sun, Cusco, ruined Inca temple, now site of St. Dominic monastery
House of the Sun, 2 rue Saint-Georges Place de la Trinité

Concepts
House of the Sun, Leo (zodiac) in astrology
House of the Sun, Urban planning in ancient Egypt

Arts and entertainment
The House of the Sun (opera) (Auringon talo), 1990 Finnish-language chamber opera by Einojuhani Rautavaara
House of the Sun (manga) (Taiyō no Ie), 2010 Japanese shōjo manga series by Ta'amo
The House of the Sun (film) (Дом Cолнца), 2010 Russian film about hippies in the Soviet Union
To the House of the Sun,  narrative poem by Tim Miller (poet)

See also
Sun House (disambiguation)
House of Suns
The House of the Rising Sun